The frontbench of His Majesty's Loyal Opposition in the Parliament of the United Kingdom consists of the Shadow Cabinet and other official shadow ministers of the political party currently serving as the Official Opposition. The Opposition front bench provide Parliamentary opposition to the British Government front bench, and is currently the Labour Party led by Keir Starmer since April 2020.

Key 

Although listed, Parliamentary Private Secretaries do not sit on the front bench. Members of the front bench sitting on Labour's National Executive Committee are also listed.

Leader of the Opposition and Cabinet Office

Foreign relations

Law and order

Economy

Social services

Environment

Culture

Transport

Devolved and local government

Parliament

See also 
 British Government frontbench
 Cabinet of the United Kingdom
 Frontbench Team of Ian Blackford
 Opposition frontbench of Keir Starmer
 Opposition frontbench of Jeremy Corbyn
 Leader of the Opposition (United Kingdom)
 List of British shadow cabinets
 Official Opposition Shadow Cabinet
 Parliamentary opposition
 Shadow Cabinet of Keir Starmer
Shadow Cabinet

Notes

Notes

References

External links
 His Majesty's Official Opposition
Spokespersons in the House of Lords

Official Opposition (United Kingdom)
Politics of the United Kingdom
Parliament of the United Kingdom